Melocactus violaceus is a species of plant in the family Cactaceae. It is endemic to Brazil.  Its natural habitats are dry savanna and sandy shores. It is threatened by habitat loss.

References

Flora of Brazil
violaceus
Vulnerable plants
Taxonomy articles created by Polbot